Tom Brabazon is an Irish politician and former Lord Mayor of Dublin. A Dublin City Councillor since 2003, he was elected Deputy Lord Mayor in 2019, and was elected Lord Mayor in February 2020 following his predecessor Paul McAuliffe's election to Dáil Éireann. His term as Lord Mayor ended on 29 June 2020.

Brabazon was co-opted to Dublin City Council in 2003 following the abolition of the dual mandate and was re-elected in 2004, 2009, 2014, and 2019.

In 2015, Brabazon was criticised for comments in Northside People on childbirth and gender quotas, but later withdrew and apologised for the remarks.

References

Fianna Fáil politicians
Living people
Lord Mayors of Dublin
Year of birth missing (living people)